Bockmer End is a hamlet in the civil parish of Medmenham to the west of Marlow in Buckinghamshire, England. It is in the town of Marlow.

References

Hamlets in Buckinghamshire